The 2019 Rhode Island Rams men's soccer team represented the University of Rhode Island during the 2019 NCAA Division I men's soccer season. It was the 59th season of the university fielding a program. The Rams were led by seventh-year head coach, Gareth Elliott.

Background 

Rhode Island finished the 2018 season with a 15–5–0 overall record and a 5–3–0 record in Atlantic 10 play, to finish 3rd in the conference. Rhode Island won the 2018 Atlantic 10 Men's Soccer Tournament and earned a berth into the 2018 NCAA Division I Men's Soccer Tournament. There, they lost to UConn in overtime, 3–4. It was Rhode Island's first berth into the NCAA Tournament since 2006.

Dominik Richter and Peder Kristiansen were named to the Atlantic 10 first team.

Roster

Schedule 

|-
!colspan=6 style=""| Regular season
|-

|-
!colspan=8 style=""| Atlantic 10 Tournament
|-

|-
!colspan=8 style=""| NCAA Tournament
|-

Rankings

References

External links 
 2019 URI Soccer Schedule  

2019
Rhode Island Rams
Rhode Island Rams
Rhode Island Rams men's soccer
Rhode Island Rams